Werauhia gladioliflora is a plant species in the genus Werauhia. This species is native to Bolivia, Costa Rica, Mexico, Venezuela and Ecuador.

References

gladioliflora
Flora of Bolivia
Flora of Costa Rica
Flora of Mexico
Flora of Venezuela
Flora of Ecuador